Aajcha Divas Majha (Marathi: आजचा दिवस माझा; translation: Today Is Mine) is a Marathi drama film released on 29 March 2013. Produced by Puja Chhabria and directed by Chandrakant Kulkarni. The film stars Sachin Khedekar, Ashwini Bhave and Mahesh Manjrekar. The film's music is by Ashok Patki and Mangesh Dhadke.

The film is based on a political background with a compassionate story.

Plot
The movie is an entertaining and a cinematic journey of a morally stricken chief minister who works efficiently and actively to help a beleaguered elderly singer who is yet to receive the government allotted flat applied for eight long years ago!

The story line depicts originality of characters such as the chief minister, his wife, his PA, the principal secretary and many personnel from the assembly. Story revolves within the time period of afternoon 3 PM to 6 AM dawn during which it highlights the political decision-making process and also gives us an insight to the unending mind games between politicians and bureaucrats within the government system.

Political movies, until now have shown people striving for the chair and power, but 'Aajcha Divas Majha' defines the hard stand taken up by a conscientious chief minister fighting to keep the self-esteem alive! The story inserts a ray of hope in political surroundings where emotions have little or no value.

Cast
 Sachin Khedekar as Vishwashrao Mohite
 Ashwini Bhave as Mrs. Mohite
 Mahesh Manjrekar as Mr. Rahimatpurkar
 Hrishikesh joshi as PD Shinde
 Pushkar Shrotri as Munir
 Anand Ingle as Bagve
 Samir Choughule as Mr Satam

Crew
Director - Chandrakant Kulkarni
Story - Ajit Dalvi and Prashant Dalvi
Producer - Puja Chhabria
Cinematographer - Rajan Kothari
Art Director - Eknath Kadam
Music Director - Ashok Patki, Mangesh Dhadke
Lyricist - Dasoo

Awards
Winner - National Film Award for Best Marathi Film 2014

Soundtrack
The music has been directed by Ashok Patki and Mangesh Dhadke, while the lyrics have been provided by Dasoo.

Track listing

References

External links 

2013 films
Indian political films
Films directed by Chandrakant Kulkarni
Best Marathi Feature Film National Film Award winners
2010s Marathi-language films